Dimple is an unincorporated community located in Butler County, Kentucky, United States.

The origin of the name "Dimple" is obscure. Dimple has been noted for its unusual place name.

References

Unincorporated communities in Butler County, Kentucky
Unincorporated communities in Kentucky